Para Qeshlaq (also Romanized as Pārā Qeshlāq) is a village in Savalan Rural District, in the Central District of Parsabad County, Ardabil Province, Iran. According the 2006 census, its population was 511, in 106 families.

References 

Towns and villages in Parsabad County